In the United States, deforestation was an ongoing process until recently. Between 2010 and 2020, the US forests increased 0.03% annually, according to FAO (Food and Agriculture Organization of the United Nations).

Native Americans cleared millions of acres of forest for many reasons, including hunting, farming, berry production, and building materials. Prior to the arrival of European-Americans, about one half of the United States land area was forest, about  estimated in 1630. Forest cover in the Eastern United States reached its lowest point in roughly 1872 with about 48 percent compared to the amount of forest cover in 1620. The majority of deforestation took place prior to 1910 with the Forest Service reporting the minimum forestation as  around 1920. The forest resources of the United States remained relatively constant through the 20th century. A 2017 study estimated 3 percent loss of forest between 1992 and 2001.

The 2005 (FAO) Global Forest Resources Assessment ranked the United States as seventh highest country losing  its old growth forests, a vast majority of which were removed prior to the 20th century.

After European colonization

For the 300 years following the arrival of Europeans, land was cleared, mostly for agriculture, at a rate that matched that of population growth. During the 19th century, while the U.S. population tripled, the total area of cropland increased by over four times, from seventy-six million to three hundred nineteen million acres. For every person added to the U.S. population during this period, farmers put another three to four acres under the plow. This trend continued until the 1920s when the amount of crop land stabilized in spite of continued population growth.

After 1963, there was a gradual decrease through the next few decades which has been reversed with recovery and slight gains in the early 21st century. Gains in forest land have resulted from conversions from crop land and pastures at a higher rate than loss of forest to development. However issues have been identified such as the continued loss of old-growth forest, the increased fragmentation of forest lands, and the increased urbanization of forest land. Between 2001 and 2020, Alaska lost more tree cover than any other U.S. state.

Previous issues

Deforestation in the United States was affected by many factors. One such factor was the effect, whether positive or negative, that the logging industry has on forests in the country. Logging in the United States is a hotly debated topic as groups who either support or oppose logging argue over its benefits and negative effects.

The biggest issue thought to be facing deforestation in the United States was illegal logging. The Forest Service and EPA work together to make sure that the permits for logging companies in the United States are granted in such a way that the forests are kept healthy and sustainable, and illegal logging reduces the chances that forests will be kept this way.

It has also been argued that trees can lower temperatures by around 10 degrees Fahrenheit and their removal can lead to warmer temperatures.

Species extinctions in the Eastern forests

Of the 28 forest bird species with habitat exclusively in that forest, Pimm claims four become extinct either wholly or mostly because of habitat loss, the passenger pigeon, Carolina parakeet, ivory-billed woodpecker, and Bachman's warbler.

See also

 Conservation movement
 Deforestation by region
 Environment of the United States
 Environmental issues in the United States
 Environmental movement in the United States
 United States Forest Service

Notes

References

Sources

External links

United States Forest Service
Save America's Forests - environmental lobby group

United States
Environmental issues in the United States
Forestry in the United States